is a passenger railway station in located in the city of Kinokawa, Wakayama Prefecture, Japan, operated by the private railway company Wakayama Electric Railway.

Lines
Kanrojimae Station is served by the Kishigawa Line, and is located 13.1 kilometers from the terminus of the line at Wakayama Station.

Station layout
The station consists of one side platform serving a single bi-directional track. The station is unattended.

Adjacent stations

History
Kanrojimae Station opened on August 18, 1933.

Passenger statistics

Surrounding Area
Kinokawa City Nishitakashi Elementary School
Kinokawa City Takashigawa Junior High School
Wakayama Prefectural Kishigawa High School

See also
List of railway stations in Japan

References

External links
 
  Kanrojimae Station timetable

Railway stations in Japan opened in 1933
Railway stations in Wakayama Prefecture
Kinokawa, Wakayama